Tepic Territory was a territory created out of the northwestern territory of the state of Jalisco, which later became present-day Nayarit.

History
The territory was created by decree of President Manuel González Flores on 12 December 1884. Its first political leader was Leopoldo Romano. Under the government of Flores, and that of his successor, Pablo Rocha y Portú, there were great industrial and agrarian advances. Coffee was cultivated in the villages of Huicicila, El Malinal, El Llano, Mecatán, Jalcocotán and Cora; cotton, in Santiago Ixcuintla and Tuxpan, from where it was supplied to the factories of Jauja and Bellavista.

Within the industrial sector, the sugar mills in Puga and La Escondida saw a great economic boost. The Tepic Cigar Factory was created, whose cigars and cigarettes were considered of first quality worldwide. Other cigar factories were El Tráfico and El Amigo del Pueblo.

Towards the end of Leopoldo Romano's government, workers' struggles began. In 1894, Francisca Quintero organized a work stoppage in the Bellavista textile factory. Two years later, there was a strike in Jauja, and in 1905, the Elias brothers led another in Bellavista.

At the outbreak of the Mexican Revolution, the population of Ixtlán del Río was the first to rise up in arms to the cry of ¡Viva Madero!

In 1911, General Martin Espinosa defeated the forces of the dictator Porfirio Diaz, he entered Tepic on May 26, and was immediately appointed political chief, replacing Mariano Ruiz (1904-1911). After the coup d'état led by Victoriano Huerta, Espinosa was overthrown, and huertista Jesus Lopez de Haro was appointed to replace him. Lopez resigned two months later in favor of fellow huertista, Agustin F. Migoni, who remained in power for five months and was succeeded by Domingo Servin, the last huertista political leader. Servin was overthrown and the young Buelna was appointed. In 1915, the conflict began between Villa and the constitutionalists. The discord reached this territory, Dozal was overthrown and replaced with general Juan Carrasco, who left power two months later, succeeded by Ernesto Damy, who in turn left power in the hands of General Juan Torres Sur (1915-1917). During the latter's administration there was no fighting, and the country began to recover. In 1916, the first labor union was created.

The tepicenses elected Juan Espinosa Bávara, Cristóbal Limón, and Marcelino Cedano to the Constituent Congress of Querétaro, where the transformation of the Territory of Tepic into the Free and Sovereign State of Nayarit was decreed.

Culture
In poetry, Amado Nervo, Antonio Zaragoza, Quirino Ordaz and Solón Argüello stood out. The music could not be outdone, being Manuel Uribe and Alejandro Manzo, the leading composers of the musical territory. The latter penned the first versions of Las Mañanitas Tepiqueñas, and Aires Nayaritas.

See also
Nayarit

References 

Territories of Mexico